Ensenada Airport  is a public, commercial airport that also functions as the "El Ciprés" Military Airbase Number 3, operated by the Mexican Air Force. It is located 3 km south of Ensenada, Baja California, Mexico. Besides military air operations, it handles general aviation services for the city of Ensenada. It is an official airport of entry into Mexico. Currently, it only handles two regional commercial airlines, with flights within the region.

Information
As part of the National Infrastructure Plan presented by Felipe Calderón, an international airport would be built in Ensenada. Construction was expected to begin on the first quarter of 2008 and initial investment was estimated at around $230 million. The airstrip would be able to receive large aircraft including the Airbus A380 and the Boeing 747. International flights to Hong Kong, Singapore, Shanghai, Tokyo, Frankfurt and Bogotá are planned.

In June 2016, Baja California State Congress passed a bill to decree the construction of the Ensenada Airport, which will be located in the Municipality of Ojos Negros, East of the city.

Air Force Units
 5th Air Group
 106 Air Squadron - Cessna 182

Airlines and destinations

References

External links

Airports in Baja California
Transport in Ensenada Municipality